Te Arawhiti ("The Bridge"), also called the Office for Māori Crown Relations, is a public service departmental agency in New Zealand. Established in 2018 by the 52nd New Zealand Parliament, it oversees the government's work with Māori as part of the Crown-Māori relations portfolio. Its creation included consolidating several existing government units and offices into the agency, including the Crown/Māori Relations Unit, the Office of Treaty Settlements, Takutai Moana Team and the Settlement Commitments Unit. The portfolio mandate was established after a public engagement process in 2018 lead by the Minister for Māori Crown Relations: Te Arawhiti, Kelvin Davis where twenty hui (meetings) around New Zealand were held, attended by 1600 people, and 227 written or online submissions were received.

References

External links 
 

Organisations based in New Zealand
Organizations established in 2018
2018 establishments in New Zealand
New Zealand public service departmental agencies